Karikili Bird Sanctuary is a  protected area located in the Chengalpattu District of the state of Tamil Nadu, India. About 100 species were recorded from this sanctuary

Karikili is situated about 10 km from Vedanthangal, and there are two tanks combined established as the bird sanctuary in 1988. This region is surrounded by open areas, paddy fields and scrub forest. Several migratory birds such as Northern Pintail, Garganey, Common Sandpiper  were recorded from Karikili.

Karikili Bird Sanctuary along with Vedanthangal Bird Sanctuary has been identified as one of the Important Bird Areas of Tamil Nadu (IBA Site Code-29, A1, IBA criteria – A4iii). Several waterbirds use Vedanthangal as a nesting site and Karikili as a foraging site. The sanctuary has been designated as a protected Ramsar site since 2022.

References

Bird sanctuaries of Tamil Nadu
Important Bird Areas of India
Coromandel Coast
South Deccan Plateau dry deciduous forests
Protected areas of Tamil Nadu
1988 establishments in Tamil Nadu
Protected areas established in 1988
Ramsar sites in India